von Post is a surname of Swedish origin.  It may refer to:

Lennart von Post (1884–1951), Swedish naturalist and geologist
Gunilla von Post (1932–2011), Swedish aristocrat who allegedly had an intimate relationship with John F. Kennedy